Jeg elsker dig is a 1957 Danish family film directed by Torben Anton Svendsen and starring Annie Birgit Garde, and Frits Helmuth.

Cast
Annie Birgit Garde as Clara
Frits Helmuth as David
Karin Nellemose as Leonora
Ebbe Rode as August
Berthe Qvistgaard as Vivian
Poul Reichhardt as André
Clara Pontoppidan as Læserbrevsredaktøren Fru Nanna
Else-Marie as Fru Sylvia
Clara Østø as Frk. Muhs
Poul Müller
Paul Hagen
Carl Ottosen
Birthe Wilke

References

External links

1957 films
1950s Danish-language films
Danish black-and-white films